Deep Springs may refer to:

Deep Springs, California, unincorporated community in Inyo County
Deep Springs College, nontraditional two-year institution located in Deep Springs Valley
Deep Springs International, sponsor of the Gayden Dlo point of use water treatment program
Deep Springs Plantation, a mansion in Stoneville, North Carolina
Deep Springs Valley, valley in the Inyo-White mountain range of California